Khokhnovskaya is a rural locality (a village) in Vinogradovsky District, Arkhangelsk Oblast, Russia. The population was 2 as of 2012.

Geography 
Khokhnovskaya is located on the Severnaya Dvina River, 46 km northwest of Bereznik (the district's administrative centre) by road. Savinskaya is the nearest rural locality.

References 

Rural localities in Vinogradovsky District